Gasa or GASA may refer to:

Places
 Gasa District, Bhutan 
 Gasa, Bhutan, capital of the Gasa District
 Gasa Dzong, the administrative center of Gasa District
 Gasa (barangay) Medina, Misamis Oriental, Philippines
 Gasa (barangay) Lakewood, Zamboanga del Sur, Philippines
 Xishuangbanna Gasa Airport, airport serving Jinghong, Yunnan, China
 Gasa (crater), a crater on Mars

Culture
 Gasa (poetry), a form of Korean classical poetry
 Gasa (hat)

Companies
GASA, a Swedish company
Grabaciones Accidentales, a Spanish record label

People
 Biuku Gasa, a Solomon Islander, one of two scouts who found the crew of John F. Kennedy's Motor Torpedo Boat PT-109

See also
 Gaza (disambiguation)